Revenge (1967) is the fifth album by comedian Bill Cosby. It was recorded live at Harrah's, Lake Tahoe, Nevada by Warner Bros. Records. It won the 1968 Grammy Award for Best Comedy Album.  It also hit #1 on the Billboard R&B chart and #2 on the magazine's Pop album chart.

Background
Like earlier albums such as I Started Out as a Child and Wonderfulness, this album features several anecdotes based on Cosby's childhood memories. It also serves to introduce Fat Albert, one of his most enduring characters.

In the track "Buck Buck", Cosby first mentions Fat Albert, his Philadelphia childhood friend who would later become the basis for the hit cartoon series Fat Albert and the Cosby Kids; Albert's signature cry "Hey! Hey! Hey!", a trademark of the later TV series, is also heard for the first time.  Old Weird Harold, another of Cosby's friends/characters, figures prominently in the "9th Street Bridge" routine.

Track listing

Side one
Revenge – 6:00
Two Daughters – 5:10
Two Brothers – 2:54
The Tank – 1:36
Smoking – 2:56
Wives – 2:37

Side two
Cool Covers – 4:22
9th St. Bridge – 5:09
Buck, Buck – 9:13
Planes – 2:03

See also
 Buck buck
 List of number-one R&B albums of 1967 (U.S.)

References

External links
 Ninth Street Bridge by Bill Cosby

1960s comedy albums
1960s spoken word albums
1967 live albums
Bill Cosby live albums
Stand-up comedy albums
Grammy Award for Best Comedy Album
Live spoken word albums
Spoken word albums by American artists
Warner Records live albums